Oliver Christian Fernández (14 October 1983 – 5 January 2012) was a Bolivian football striker.

References

1983 births
2012 deaths
Sportspeople from Cochabamba
Bolivian footballers
Club Aurora players
Municipal Real Mamoré players
C.D. Jorge Wilstermann players
Bolivian Primera División players
Association football forwards